Menemerus minshullae is a small to medium-sized jumping spider in the genus Menemerus. It has been found in Malawi, South Africa and Zimbabwe. It was first described by Wanda Wesołowska in 1999, although the male was known as Menemerus manicus until 2007.

References

Spiders described in 1999
Arthropods of Malawi
Arthropods of Zimbabwe
Salticidae
Spiders of Africa
Spiders of South Africa
Taxa named by Wanda Wesołowska